Princess Anastasia Petrović-Njegoš of Montenegro (4 January [O.S. 23 December 1867] 1868 – 25 November 1935) was the daughter of King Nikola I Petrović-Njegoš of Montenegro (1841–1921) and his wife, Queen Milena (1847–1923).  Through her second marriage, she became Grand Duchess Anastasia Nikolaevna Romanova of Russia.  She and her sister "Militza" (Princess Milica), having married Russian royal brothers, were known colloquially as the "Montenegrin princesses" during the last days of Imperial Russia, and may have contributed to its downfall by the introduction of Grigori Rasputin to the Empress Alexandra.

Life

Early life
Princess Anastasia was born in Cetinje, Montenegro, on 4 January 1868, the third child and third daughter of her parents. Although named Anastasia at birth, after her paternal grandmother, she was often known Princess Stana Petrovich Njegosh of Montenegro. As of the date of her father's assumption of the title and style of Royal Highness in 1900, she became known as Her Royal Highness Princess Stana Petrovich Njegosh of Montenegro. She retained her childhood nickname of "Stana" to close relations.

Anastasia was educated at the Smolny Institute with her older sister, Princess Milica.

First marriage

On 28 August n.s., 1889, at the Imperial Russian Palace of Peterhof, Stana married Prince George Maximilianovich of Leuchtenberg (later the Duke of Leuchtenberg.) The Duke had previously been married and widowed, with one son, Alexander Georgievich, from his prior marriage to Princess Therese of Oldenburg. The couple had two children:

 Sergei Georgievich, 8th Duke von Leuchtenberg (1890–1974).
 Elena Georgievena, Duchess of Leuchtenberg, Princess Romanovskaya (1892–1971). She married on 18 July 1917, in Yalta, Count Stefan Tyszkiewicz (1894–1976, London). He was son of Count Władysław Tyszkiewicz and Princess Krystyna Maria Lubomirska. By birth he was a member of powerful and wealthy Tyszkiewicz family, one of few families which belonged to Magnates of Poland and Lithuania.

Second marriage
On 29 April 1907, at the age of 39, Anastasia was married to Grand Duke Nicholas Nikolaevich of Russia (1856–1929). The marriage was childless. Both her husbands were descendants of Emperor Nicholas I of Russia (1796–1855): the first one was his grandson through a maternal line, and the second one was his grandson through a direct male line.

Both Anastasia and her second husband Nicholas were religious Eastern Orthodox Christians, with a tendency to and interest in Persian mysticism. Since the Montenegrins were a fiercely Slavic, anti-Turkish people from the Balkans, Anastasia reinforced the Pan Slav tendencies of Nicholas. Her sister, Princess Milica (Cetinje, Montenegro, 26 July 1866 – Alexandria, Egypt, 5 September 1951) was married to Grand Duke Peter Nicolaievich Romanov of Russia, brother of Grand Duke Nicholas Nicolaevich. The two Montenegrin princesses were thus also sisters-in-law, as their husbands were brothers.

Anastasia and her sister were intrigued by the more mystical side of the Eastern Orthodox religion; they were early supporters of the French seer "Dr." Philippe Vachot and of the starets Rasputin, and introduced both in turn to the Empress Alexandra Feodorovna, the last Tsarina of Russia. According to popular Russian belief, the influence of Rasputin was instrumental in the downfall of the Romanov family.

Anastasia's husband, Grand Duke Nicholas Nikolaevich of Russia (1856–1929), was Commander in Chief of the Russian Army during the first year of World War I, carrying out campaigns on the Austro-German front and in the Caucasus.  His Supreme Commandership was terminated by Tsar Nicholas on 21 August 1915.

Post-revolution

In March 1917, the last Tsar was overthrown and the ruling Romanov family removed from power by the Bolsheviks.  Anastasia and her husband lived from 1917–1919 first in the Caucasus, then in the Crimea.  From Yalta in the Crimea, Anastasia and her husband escaped Russia in 1919 aboard a British battleship, HMS Marlborough. They settled briefly in Italy, living with her sister Elena, Queen of Italy and later in France, spending winters on the Riviera.  

She died in Cap d'Antibes on 15 November 1935, having outlived her husband by six years. Grand Duchess Anastasia and her husband died in exile and were originally buried in the church of St. Archangel Michael in Cannes, France. Requests to transfer their remains came from Nicholas Romanov, Prince of Russia, who died in 2014 and Prince Dimitri Romanov (who died in 2016), and were made in 2014. Their remains were re-buried in Moscow, at the Bratsky military cemetery in May 2015.

References

External links

1868 births
1935 deaths
Montenegrin princesses
Eastern Orthodox Christians from Montenegro
Petrović-Njegoš dynasty
People from Cetinje
Beauharnais
Duchesses of Leuchtenberg
Russian grand duchesses by marriage
Emigrants from the Russian Empire to Italy
Emigrants from the Russian Empire to France
Burials at Bratsky Cemetery, Moscow
Daughters of kings